Ustad Inayat Hussain Khan (1849–1919) was an Indian classical vocalist, and the founder of Rampur-Sahaswan gharana.

Early life

Career
He first married the daughter of Haddu Khan of the Gwalior gharana. His singing style has influences of the Dhrupad singing typical of the Gwalior gharana, and the Rampur-Shahaswan style is sometimes regarded as an offshoot of the Gwalior gharana.

References

1849 births
1919 deaths
Hindustani singers
19th-century Indian male classical singers
People from Budaun district
20th-century Indian male classical singers
Singers from Uttar Pradesh
20th-century Khyal singers